Sangeetpedia is an encyclopedia of Indian classical music. It was released on DVD in the mid-2000s. It features audio clips, biographies, and definitions of common terms. It was created by Enayet Hossain and Anjan Chattopadhyay, United States-based performers of Indian classical music.

References

External links
Sangeetpedia Home
Sangeetpedia Mobile on iTunes

Indian classical music
Indian music mass media
Indian encyclopedias
Encyclopedias of music
2000s books
21st-century encyclopedias
21st-century Indian books